Caroline Fourest (born 19 September 1975), is a French feminist writer, film director, journalist, radio presenter at France Culture, and editor of the magazine ProChoix. She was also a columnist for Charlie Hebdo, for Le Monde until 14 July 2012, and she joined Marianne in 2016.

Education and career
A graduate in sociology and political science, Fourest has written many books about the conservative right, the anti-abortion movement (France and USA), and contemporary fundamentalist trends in Abrahamic religions.  She also began serving as the President of the Gay and Lesbian Center in 1999.

In March 2006, Fourest signed MANIFESTO: Together facing the new totalitarianism, a manifesto opposing Islamist totalitarianism that gained wide publicity. The other eleven signatories include Salman Rushdie, Ibn Warraq, Maryam Namazie, Taslima Nasreen, and Ayaan Hirsi Ali.

Fourest has received several political awards for her work, including the National Award of "Laïcité" in 2005, and the "Award of the political book" in 2006. She is an honorary associate of the National Secular Society,

She is an advisory board member of the Anna Lindh Foundation, an organization focused on intercultural dialogue.

Fourest has opposed far right FN politician Marine Le Pen and her politics in a book co-authored with Fiammetta Venner. She is the author of Frère Tariq ("Brother Tariq" 2008), a critical look at the works of Muslim intellectual Tariq Ramadan, the central charges of which she and Mr. Ramadan later debated.

In 2014 the Conseil supérieur de l'audiovisuel, the institution regulating the media in France, accuses Caroline Fourest of lack of rigor and unverified statements in her reporting of the Russo-Ukrainian War.

Defamation accusations
In October 2012, Caroline Fourest was sentenced to pay a fine of 800 euros and 3300 euros respectively in damages for libel against Marine Le Pen, Jean-Marie Le Pen and Franck Chauffroy in a biography she wrote titled Marine Le Pen.

In October 2014, Fourest suggested that a racist attack on 17 year old Muslim girl Rabia Bentot in 2013 could have been fabricated or that if it was real, Bentot's family could have been responsible. Fourest was subsequently accused of libel and ordered to pay 6,000 euros. The verdict has been appealed and overturned since the accusation was made after the three-month legal delay.  Bentot was ordered to pay back to Caroline Fourest 4,000 euros for wrongful legal action.

Works

Books

 L'Islamophobie Jérôme Blanchet-Gravel (dir.) et Éric Debroise (codir.), éditions Dialogue Nord-Sud, 2016, 250 p.
 Géneration offensée. De la police de la culture à la police de la pensée, 2020.

Filmography
 Sœur Innocenta, priez pour nous !, medium-length documentary co-directed with Fiammetta Venner.
 Safia et Sarah, short film, 18 minutes (2004).
 Hymen : certifiées vierges, documentary (Envoyé spécial, France 2, 2008).
 La Bataille des droits de l'homme, documentary (Arte, 2009).
 Des Petits Soldats contre l'avortement, documentary (Canal+, 2011).
 Marine Le Pen, l'héritière, documentary co-directed with Fiammetta Venner (France 2, 2011).
 100 Muslim women talk about themselves, documentary series of 20 episodes co-directed with Fiammetta Venner (France 24, 2011).
 Nos seins, nos armes ! (Our breasts, our weapons!), documentary about Femen co-directed and co-written with Nadia El Fani (France 2, 2013)
 Les Réseaux de l'extrême, documentary series in four parts: Les Obsédés du complot, Les Radicaux de l'islam, Les Enragés de l'identité and Les Naufragés de Sion (France 5, 2013).
 Cahiers de doléances, documentary series in 9 parts: (LCP, 2013).
 Sisters in Arms, a war-drama film (2019) based on real events (Red Snake was the working title).

References

External links
Caroline Fourest's blog (in English)
Caroline Fourest's blog (in French)

1975 births
21st-century French women writers
French anti-racism activists
Charlie Hebdo people
Chevaliers of the Ordre des Arts et des Lettres
French critics of Islam
French feminists
Lesbian feminists
French lesbian writers
French LGBT journalists
French LGBT rights activists
Living people
People from Aix-en-Provence
Secularism in France
Women civil rights activists
21st-century LGBT people